Ron Hicks is an American politician from the state of Missouri. A Republican, he began representing district 102 in the Missouri House of Representatives in January 2019; he represented district 107 from 2013 to 2016.

Missouri House of Representatives

107th district
Hicks was first elected to the Missouri House from the 107th district in November 2012, and re-elected in 2014. He chose not to run for re-election in 2016, and instead ran unsuccessfully for mayor of St. Peters. After moving outside his district in June, Hicks resigned from the House in August 2016.

102nd district
Hicks ran in 2018 to represent the 102nd district in the Missouri House. After winning his party's primary election by only four votes, he went on to win the 2018 general election with about a 20 percent margin. Days before the primary, Hicks' campaign distributed flyers that falsely claimed he was the "only candidate endorsed" by the Missouri Right to Life PAC. Members of the Hicks campaign report the false claim was actually an error on the part of the printing company and Hicks was never approached by local media to apologize or tell his side of the story.

Hicks represents a portion of Saint Charles County in the Weldon Spring area, straddling U.S. Route 40/61 on both sides of the Weldon Spring Conservation Area. He succeeded Kurt Bahr who was term limited and instead ran for and won as Director of Elections.

Election results

References

21st-century American politicians
Living people
People from St. Charles County, Missouri
People from St. Peters, Missouri
Republican Party members of the Missouri House of Representatives
Year of birth missing (living people)